Samantha Terán Quintanilla (born May 6, 1981, in Mexico City) is a professional female squash player who represents Mexico. Teran first joined the WISPA Tour in 2000, and she entered the world top twenty for the first time in 2008 as she won the eighth and ninth Tour titles of her career. These followed two in 2007, the Gannon Open and Toronto Open, in both events beating American Latasha Khan in the final.

In early 2008 it was Khan who was despatched in the finals of the Liberty Bell and Windy City Opens in the United States. The Mexican did it again in May to win the Subway Goshen Open, but this time Khan was beaten in the semis. Teran then captured another two title at the end of June at Los Angeles Open, and at the Harrow Mexican Open, an event she had developed herself.

Added to her twelve Tour titles are a gold medal in the Pan American Games and four golds in the Central American and Caribbean Games. Teran reached a career-high world ranking of World No. 15 in February 2009.

In 2011 Terán reached the semi-finals of the 2011 World Open, becoming the first Mexican to have done so.

See also
 Official Women's Squash World Ranking

References

External links 
 
 
 

1981 births
Living people
Mexican female squash players
Pan American Games gold medalists for Mexico
Pan American Games bronze medalists for Mexico
Pan American Games medalists in squash
Squash players at the 2003 Pan American Games
Squash players at the 2007 Pan American Games
Squash players at the 2011 Pan American Games
Squash players at the 2015 Pan American Games
Sportspeople from Mexico City
Central American and Caribbean Games gold medalists for Mexico
Competitors at the 2006 Central American and Caribbean Games
Competitors at the 2010 Central American and Caribbean Games
Competitors at the 2014 Central American and Caribbean Games
Competitors at the 2018 Central American and Caribbean Games
Squash players at the 2019 Pan American Games
Competitors at the 2013 World Games
Competitors at the 2017 World Games
Central American and Caribbean Games medalists in squash
Medalists at the 2011 Pan American Games
Medalists at the 2015 Pan American Games
Medalists at the 2019 Pan American Games